Blanchard is a French family name. It is also used as a given name. It derives from the Old French word blanchart which meant "whitish, bordering upon white". It is also an obsolete term for a white horse.

Geographical distribution
As of 2014, 42.3% of all known bearers of the surname Blanchard were residents of France (frequency 1:1,117), 36.3% of the United States (1:7,073), 8.7% of Canada (1:3,021), 3.5% of England (1:11,189), 1.7% of Haiti (1:4,397), 1.2% of Vietnam (1:56,908) and 1.1% of Australia (1:15,892).

In France, the frequency of the surname was higher than national average (1:1,117) in the following regions:
 1. Saint-Barthélemy (1:18)
 2. Pays de la Loire (1:424)
 3. Centre-Val de Loire (1:574)
 4. French Guiana (1:677)
 5. Brittany (1:690)
 6. Nouvelle-Aquitaine (1:700)
 7. Bourgogne-Franche-Comté (1:1,098)

In Canada, the frequency of the surname was higher than national average (1:3,021) in the following provinces:
 1. New Brunswick (1:511)
 2. Prince Edward Island (1:544)
 3. Newfoundland and Labrador (1:1,106)
 4. Quebec (1:1,693)
 5. Yukon (1:1,726)

Surname
Wikipedia articles about people with the surname Blanchard:

Al Blanchard (born 1952), ice hockey right winger
Alain Blanchard (born 1419), commander of the crossbowmen of Rouen during the Hundred Years' War
Alana Blanchard (born 1990), American professional surfer
Albert Gallatin Blanchard (1810–1891), American Civil War general in the Confederate Army
Allen Blanchard (1929–2008), Australian federal politician
Amy Ella Blanchard (1854–1926), American writer of juvenile fiction
Antoine Blanchard (1910–1988), French painter
Arthur Bailly-Blanchard (1855–1925), American diplomat
Barry Blanchard (born 1959), Canadian mountaineer and presenter
Brian Blanchard (born 1958), attorney, judge in Wisconsin
C. Lemoine Blanchard (1910–1986), served on the Los Angeles City Council from 1959 until 1963
Cary Blanchard (born 1968), former American football placekicker in the National Football League
Charles A. Blanchard (1848–1925), the second president of Wheaton College in Wheaton, Illinois
Charles A. Blanchard (lawyer) (born 1959), United States lawyer who served as general counsel of the army
Charles V. Blanchard (1866–1939), American politician who served as a Massachusetts state representative and a Massachusetts state senator
Claude Blanchard (1932–2006), Québécois pop singer and actor
Dick Blanchard (born 1949), linebacker in the National Football League
Doc Blanchard (1924–2009), American college football player and Heisman Trophy winner
Edgar Blanchard (1924–1972), American guitarist and bandleader
Edmond Blanchard (1954–2014), Canadian jurist and politician
Edmund Blanchard (1824–1886), lawyer and prominent businessman in Centre County, Pennsylvania
Édouard-Théophile Blanchard (1844–1879), nineteenth-century French painter
Edward Litt Laman Blanchard (1820–1889), English writer best known for his contributions to the Drury Lane pantomime
Elizabeth Blanchard (educator) (1834–1891), American educator who was the seventh president of Mount Holyoke College
Elizabeth Blanchard (New Hampshire politician), Democratic member of the New Hampshire House of Representatives 2002–2010
Elmer Blanchard (1927–1970), lawyer and political figure on Prince Edward Island
Émile Blanchard (1819–1900), French zoologist
Erin Blanchard (born 1989), American gymnast
Esprit Antoine Blanchard (1696–1770), French baroque composer, a contemporary of Jean-Philippe Rameau
Étienne Blanchard (1843–1918), Canadian politician
Eugénie Blanchard (1896–2010) the world's oldest person at the time of her death on November 4, 2010
Françoise Blanchard (1954–2013), French actress
Francis Blanchard AC (1916–2009), the second longest-serving Director–General of the International Labour Organization
Frank N. Blanchard (1888–1937), American herpetologist, and professor of zoology at the University of Michigan
Gabriel Blanchard (1630–1704), known as Blanchard Le Neveu, the only son of Jacques Blanchard, born in Paris in 1630
George S. Blanchard (1920–2006), United States Army four-star general who served as Commander in Chief
George Washington Blanchard (1884–1964), member of the United States House of Representatives from 1933 to 1935
Georges Maurice Jean Blanchard (1877–1954), French general in World War II
Gerald Blanchard (born 1972), Canadian jewel thief and criminal mastermind
Harry Blanchard (1929–1960), Formula One driver from Buenos Aires, Argentina
Hiram Blanchard (1820–1874), Nova Scotia politician
Jérôme Blanchard (born 1981), French pair skater
J. Merrill Blanchard (1881–1914), American college football and men's basketball head coach
Jack Blanchard (born 1942), one-half of singing duo, with Misty Morgan
Jacques Blanchard (1600–1638), French baroque painter
James Blanchard (born 1942), American politician and former governor of Michigan
James Blanchard (Canadian politician) (1876–1952), farmer and political figure in Ontario
James Blanchard (scientist), Associate Professor of Community Health Science at the University of Manitoba
James W. Blanchard (1903–1987), American submarine commander during the Pacific War
Jay Blanchard (born 1946), served one term as a state senator in Arizona, representing District 30 for the Democrats
Jean-Baptiste Blanchard (after 1595–1665), French painter
Jean-Baptiste Blanchard (1731–1797), French Jesuit and educator, one of the contemporary opponents of Rosseau
Jean-Pierre Blanchard (1753–1809), French inventor and pioneer balloonist
Jeremiah Blanchard (1859–1939), farmer and political figure in Prince Edward Island
Jocelyn Blanchard (born 1972), French footballer
John Blanchard, Canadian television director and producer
John Blanchard, British designer and creative director
John Blanchard (politician) (1787–1849), Whig member of the U.S. House of Representatives from Pennsylvania
Johnny Blanchard (1933–2009), American baseball player
Jonathan Blanchard (abolitionist) (1811–1892), pastor, educator, social reformer, abolitionist and the first president of Wheaton College
Jonathan Blanchard (statesman) (1738–1788), American politician
Joseph Blanchard (1704–1758), New Hampshire soldier and politician
Jotham Blanchard (1800–1839), lawyer, newspaper editor and political figure in Nova Scotia
Jules Blanchard (1832–1916), French sculptor
Justin Blanchard, American actor
Ken Blanchard (born 1939) American management expert known for The One Minute Manager
Leo Blanchard (born 1955), former professional Canadian football offensive lineman
Leonardo Blanchard (born 1988), Italian footballer
Lory Blanchard (1924–2013), New Zealand rugby league footballer and coach
Louis Raynaud, dit Blanchard (1789–1868), farmer and political figure in Lower Canada
Lowell Blanchard (1910–1968), American radio presenter and performer
Lynda Blanchard (born 1959), American ambassador to Slovenia
María Blanchard (1881–1932), Spanish painter
Marc Blanchard (died 2009), American professor of Comparative Literature and Critical Theory at the University of California, Davis
Mari Blanchard (1927–1970), American actress
Maxime Blanchard (born 1986), French footballer defender
Newton C. Blanchard (1849–1922), United States Senator and Governor of Louisiana
Nicolas Blanchard (born 1987), Canadian professional ice hockey player
Okie Blanchard (Claire H. Blanchard) (died 1989), head football coach in 1940 at the University of Wyoming
Olivier Blanchard (born 1948), French economist
Paul Harwood Blanchard (1923–2011), American glider pilot and author 
Pharamond Blanchard (1805–1873), French historical subject and landscape painter
Porter Blanchard (1886–1973), American silversmith
Rachel Blanchard (born 1976), Canadian actress
Raoul Blanchard (1877–1965), French geographer
Raphaël Blanchard (1857–1919), French zoologist
Ray Blanchard (born 1945), Canadian sexologist famous for Blanchard's transsexualism typology
Red Blanchard (1914–1980), American comedian and country musician
Red Blanchard (radio personality) (born 1920), American radio show personality in California markets
Richard E. Blanchard Sr. (1925–2004), writer of the gospel song Fill My Cup Lord
Ron Blanchard, Australian film and television actor
Rowan Blanchard (born 2001), American actress
Samuel Laman Blanchard (1804–1845), British author and journalist
Smoke Blanchard (1915–1989), American mountaineer, climber, trekking leader, guide, world traveler, writer, Buddhist, and a truck driver
Sophie Blanchard (1778–1819), French aeronaut and the first woman professional balloonist
Stanislas Blanchard (1871–1949), Canadian politician and gentleman
Steve Blanchard (December 4, 1958), stage actor best known for his musical theatre roles
Susan Blanchard (actress) (born 1948), American actress known for her role on All My Children
Susan Blanchard (socialite) (born 1928), known for her marriages to Henry Fonda, Michael Wager, and Richard Widmark
Tammy Blanchard (born 1976), American actress
Tamsin Blanchard, British fashion journalist and author
Terence Blanchard (born 1962), American jazz trumpeter
Théotime Blanchard (1844–1911), teacher, farmer, merchant and politician in New Brunswick, Canada
Thomas Blanchard (inventor) (1788–1864), American inventor who pioneered interchangeable parts
Tim Blanchard (born 1987), Australian championship-winning motor racing driver
Tom Blanchard (born 1948), former American football punter
Tully Blanchard (born 1954), American professional wrestler
Valentine Blanchard (1831–1901), Victorian photographer
Vaughn Blanchard (1889–1969), American track and field athlete who competed in the 1912 Summer Olympics
William Blanchard (comedian) (1769–1835), English comedian
William H. Blanchard (1916–1966), United States Air Force officer
William Isaac Blanchard (died 1790), stenographer

Given name
Wikipedia articles about people with the given name Blanchard:
Alva Blanchard Adams (1875–1941), Democratic politician who represented Colorado in the United States Senate
Azariel Blanchard Miller (1878–1941), an American farmer, rancher, and developer
Blanchard Montgomery (born 1961), a retired American football linebacker
Blanchard Ryan (born 1967), an American actress
Carla Blanchard Dartez (b. 1965), a Democratic former member of the Louisiana House of Representatives from District 51
Carolyn Blanchard Allen (1921-2018), American politician
Clark Blanchard Millikan (1903–1966), a distinguished professor of aeronautics at the California Institute of Technology (Caltech)
Fleming Blanchard McCurdy, PC (1875–1952), a Canadian politician
Forrester Blanchard Washington (1887-1963), the first of four children born to John Washington and Lucy Wily Washington in 1887
Graves Blanchard Erskine (1897–1973), United States Marine Corps officer in World War II
Kempster Blanchard Miller (1870–1933), an American engineer, author, and businessman
Lafayette Blanchard Gleason (1863–1937), the Secretary of the Republican State Committee from 1906 to 1937
Louise Blanchard Bethune (1856–1913), the first American woman known to have worked as a professional architect
Maurice Blanchard Cohill Jr. (born 1929), United States federal judge
Serge Blanchard Oba, a Congolese politician
Thomas Blanchard Stowell (1846–1927), a distinguished American educator
Victor Blanchard Scheffer (1906–2011), a prominent American mammalogist and the author of eleven books relating to naturalism
William Blanchard Jerrold (1826–1884), an English journalist and author

See also 
Blanshard (disambiguation)
Governor Blanchard (disambiguation)

References

French masculine given names
French-language surnames